Stictorhinus potamius is a species of freshwater eel in the family Ophichthidae. It is the only member of its genus. It is found in the major river basins of Brazil.

References

Ophichthidae
Fish described in 1975